Carlos Alberto Paparoni Ramírez (10 September 1988) is a Venezuelan politician, son of politician Alexis Paparoni. He is a deputy of the National Assembly for the fourth circuit of the Mérida state.  During the 2019 Venezuelan presidential crisis, he has been working as an aide and commissioner of finance to interim president Juan Guaidó.  

While protesting outside Venezuela's Supreme Court with other opposition politicians in March 2017, he was attacked by armed groups and the Venezuelan National Guard.

References 

Justice First politicians
Members of the National Assembly (Venezuela)
21st-century Venezuelan lawyers
Central University of Venezuela alumni
Pages with unreviewed translations
1988 births
Living people